Gorjani is a municipality in Osijek-Baranja County, Croatia. There are 1,550 inhabitants, 97% of whom are Croats (2011 census). Gorjani village was the seat of the House of Garai (Garay).

Name
The name of the village in Croatian is plural.

History

King Béla IV of Hungary granted the eponymous domain of Gara to John of Clan Dorozsma and his son, Stephen, in 1269. The charter of grant mentioned that Stephen was swordbearer to the King's son, Béla, Duke of Slavonia. Stephen's sons, Andrew and Paul, were the ancestors of the two branches of the family. Andrew's son, Nicholas I Garai was Palatine of Hungary from 1375 until his death. Near Gorjani, he courageously defended his cousin and sovereign, Queen Mary of Hungary, and her mother, Elizabeth of Bosnia, from rebels.

Gorjani in 1387 was already a market town, which by 1478 held weekly markets.

After the Garai family died out, some of their estates were inherited by the Zay of Csömör family, others were granted to John Corvinus.

References

Municipalities of Croatia